Melody Pool is an Australian country-folk musician from Kurri Kurri, New South Wales.

She first stepped on stage with her father, country musician Alby Pool, when she was 8 years old, and was performing solo aged 9.

During her teens Pool played in her father's band, and began releasing her own music starting with the EP Heart to Heart Talk in 2008. This was followed by another EP Awake, You’re All Around Me in 2011, before she crowdfunded money to travel to Nashville in September 2012 to record her debut album The Hurting Scene.

Produced by Brad Jones and Jace Everett, the album was recorded in six days and released in 2013. Initially released independently, Pool was then signed to Liberation Music and Mushroom Music Publishing who reissued the album in July 2013.

In 2014 she covered Joni Mitchell's River for Katie Noonan's collaborative album Songs That Made Me. The album reached #7 on the ARIA Compilation Chart.

After moving to Coburg, Victoria, she began writing her next album Deep Dark Savage Heart which was released in 2016. It was listed as #50 on Rolling Stone Australia's 50 Best Albums of 2016.

Following the album release and tour, Pool said she would take a break from music to put her mental health first. She spoke about her battles with depression on a 2017 episode of ABC's Australian Story which  focused on her music career and mental health struggles.

In 2020 Pool revealed she was recording a new album on a farm in regional NSW, and began playing new songs live in 2021.

Awards 
2013 - Telstra Road to Discovery - Songwriter of the Year

Discography 
EPs

 Heart to Heart Talk (2008)
 You’re All Around Me (2011)

Albums

 The Hurting Scene (2013)
 Deep Dark Savage Heart (2016)

References 

Living people
Australian country musicians
Date of birth missing (living people)
Year of birth missing (living people)